Juan Pablo Guzmán (born January 29, 1981) is a professional tennis player and coach from Argentina.

In 2007, Guzmán won the ATP doubles title in Amersfoort with Juan-Pablo Brzezicki where the Argentine duo defeated Robin Haase and Rogier Wassen in straight sets in the final. In singles, he reached the quarterfinals of Umag in 2006 and made the main draw first round of four Grand Slam tournaments between 2002 and 2007.

Performance timeline

Singles

ATP Career Finals

Doubles: 1 (1 title)

ATP Challenger and ITF Futures finals

Singles: 11 (5–6)

Doubles: 24 (12–12)

External links
 
 

Argentine male tennis players
Tennis players from Buenos Aires
1981 births
Living people
21st-century Argentine people